The 1974 NAIA Division II football season was the 19th season of college football sponsored by the NAIA and the fifth season of play of the NAIA's lower division for football.

The season was played from August to November 1974 and culminated in the 1974 NAIA Division II Football National Championship, played on December 14, 1974 on the campus of Texas Lutheran University in Seguin, Texas.

Texas Lutheran defeated Missouri Valley in the championship game, 42–0, to win their first NAIA national title.

Conference standings

Postseason

See also
 1974 NAIA Division I football season
 1974 NCAA Division I football season
 1974 NCAA Division II football season
 1974 NCAA Division III football season

References

 
NAIA Football National Championship